Asia Dragon Trust plc is a large British investment trust dedicated to investments in Far East companies. The company is listed on the London Stock Exchange. The Chairman is James Will.

History
The company was established in 1987. It changed its name from Edinburgh Dragon Trust to Asia Dragon Trust in November 2019.

References

External links
 Official site

Investment trusts of the United Kingdom